Need Your Love may refer to:

 "Need Your Love", a song by Status Quo from Ma Kelly's Greasy Spoon, 1970
 "Need Your Love" (Cheap Trick song), 1978
 Need Your Love (album) or the title song, by Do As Infinity, 2005
 "Need Your Love" (The Temper Trap song), 2012
 "Need Your Love", a song by Andrew Bayer from If It Were You, We'd Never Leave, 2013
 "Need Your Love", a song by GJan, 2013
 "Need Your Love", a song by Curtis Harding from Face Your Fear, 2017
 "Need Your Love", a song by Gryffin from Gravity, 2019
 "Need Your Love", a song by Tennis from Swimmer, 2020

See also 
 I Need Your Love (disambiguation)